Diplazium laffanianum, or Governor Laffan's fern, is a species of fern endemic to Bermuda. It is listed as extinct in the wild. It is named after Sir Robert Laffan who sent a living plant to the Royal Botanic Gardens, Kew in 1880. The fern was found in the mouths of caves and rock crevices until 1905. 1905 was the last time Diplazium laffanianum was seen in the wild. In 2002, the spores were sent to the United States to propagate. After propagation, they were sent back to Bermuda from 2009 to 2019. In 2014, a re-introduction programme began using the zoo-raised ferns. As of 2021, there are thirty subjects of Diplazium laffanianum surviving in wild sites.

References

laffanianum
Flora of Bermuda